America's Great Divide: From Obama to Trump is a 2020 two-part television documentary film about the political divide between the United States Democratic and Republican Party in the early 21st century. Produced by the investigative journalism program Frontline on PBS, it charts how the two major political parties became increasingly adversarial to each other due to factors of race, media, and misinformation, from the 2008 presidential election to the presidency of Donald Trump. The film was directed by Michael Kirk and written by Kirk and Mike Wiser, and was first aired on PBS in two parts on January 13 and 14, 2020.

Interviewees

 Yamiche Alcindor, PBS NewsHour
 David Axelrod, fmr. Obama chief strategist
 Matt Bai, author of The Argument
 Peter Baker, author of Obama: The Call of History, co-author of Kremlin Rising
 Dan Balz, The Washington Post
 Kurt Bardella, fmr. spokesman of Breitbart News
 Mark Barden, parent of Sandy Hook victim
 Steve Bannon, fmr. chmn. of Breitbart News
 Joe Biden, fmr. vice president
 John Boehner, fmr. speaker of the house
 Ronald Brownstein, author of The Second Civil War
 Rep. Eric Cantor, fmr. house minority whip, house majority leader
 Jelani Cobb, The New Yorker, author of The Substance of Hope
 Robert Costa, moderator of Washington Week
 Ann Coulter, author of Mugged and ¡Adios, America!
 William Daley, fmr. Obama chief of staff
 Robert Draper, The New York Times Magazine
 Michael Eric Dyson, author of The Black Presidency
 Marc Fisher, co-author of Trump Revealed
 Timothy Geithner, fmr. secretary of the treasury
 Rep. Newt Gingrich, fmr. speaker of the house
 Susan Glasser, co-author of Kremlin Rising
 Joshua Green, Bloomberg Businessweek, author of The Devil's Bargain
 Rep. Luis Gutiérrez, 1993–2019
 Rep. Tim Huelskamp, Tea Party congress (2011–19)
 Valerie Jarrett, fmr. Obama adviser
 Broderick Johnson, fmr. Obama adviser
 Megyn Kelly, fmr. Fox News anchor
 Michael Kranish, author of Trump Revealed
 Rep. Raúl Labrador, Tea Party congress (2011–19)
 Mark Leibovich, The New York Times Magazine
 Wesley Lowery, The Washington Post
 Frank Luntz, GOP pollster
 Alec MacGillis, ProPublica
 Omarosa Manigault, The Apprentice contestant
 Alex Marlow, Breitbart News editor-in-chief
 Cecilia Muñoz, fmr. Obama adviser
 Shailagh Murray, fmr. Obama adviser
 Sam Nunberg, fmr. Trump political adviser
 Norman Ornstein, American Enterprise Institute
 James Poniewozik, TV critic of The New York Times
 John Podesta, fmr. Obama adviser
 Robert Reich, secretary of labor (1993–97), author of Beyond Outrage
 David Remnick, editor of The New Yorker
 Ben Rhodes, fmr. Obama adviser
 Anthony Scaramucci, fmr. Trump campaign adviser
 Noam Scheiber, author of The Escape Artists
 Steve Schmidt, fmr. John McCain campaign adviser
 Gabriel Sherman, New York magazine (2008–17)
 Roger Stone, fmr. Trump political adviser
 Charlie Sykes, fmr. conservative radio host
 Katy Tur, NBC News
 David Wessel, author of In Fed We Trust
 Judy Woodruff, PBS NewsHour anchor

Production
On December 20, 2019, Frontline announced that it will release the two-part television documentary titled America's Great Divide: From Obama to Trump on January 13 and 14, 2020, which will comprehensively examine "the growth of a toxic political environment that has paralyzed Washington and dramatically deepened the gulf between Americans", and provide context for the election year of 2020. Director Michael Kirk intended for the film to highlight the irony in Obama's promise to unify the country, "that by the end of his presidency -- he freely admitted and everyone else could see -- that the division was even deeper, even broader, that racism was even more rampant." A preview of the documentary was released on January 6, 2020.

Release
America's Great Divide first aired on PBS in the United States on January 13 and 14, 2020. On the same day of the broadcast of "Part 2", both parts of the documentary film were made available by Frontline for streaming on YouTube without charge.

Critical response
Brian Lowery of CNN praised America's Great Divide for "admirably" charting in detail the deepening division within the United States through the presidencies of Barack Obama and Donald Trump, stating that "The sobering takeaway from 'America's Great Divide,' explored at some length in the second half, is whether the nastiness that defines current political discourse is irrevocable. John Doyle of the Canadian newspaper The Globe and Mail also commended the documentary for its compelling presentation of the "central threads" which led to the election of Trump, stating that it is "sobering, at times unnerving and often startling."

References

External links
 PBS official site
 Part 1 on IMDb
 Part 2 on IMDb

2020 films
2020 television films
2020 documentary films
American documentary television films
Documentary films about elections in the United States
Documentary films about presidents of the United States
Documentary films about the media
Films about Barack Obama
Films about disinformation
Films about Donald Trump
Frontline (American TV program)
PBS original programming
Films directed by Michael Kirk
2020s English-language films
2020s American films